Batman Unlimited: Monster Mayhem is a 2015 American animated superhero film and the second entry in the Batman Unlimited series. It was released on August 18, 2015 on Blu-ray, DVD and Digital HD. It is a sequel to Batman Unlimited: Animal Instincts.

Plot
A new crime wave strikes Gotham City. On Halloween Night, Solomon Grundy and Silver Banshee escape from Arkham Asylum and meet with Scarecrow, dodging Nightwing and  Green Arrow along the way. Video game designer Gogo Shoto is kidnapped by Clayface. Scarecrow and Silver Banshee steal an artificial intelligence designed by Professor Ivo. Solomon Grundy steals a battery at the atomic power plant despite Nightwing's attempt to stop him. Grundy loads the battery into an ice cream truck driven by the Joker. The Joker forces Shoto to help him play a prank on the citizens of Gotham.

Bruce Wayne, Oliver Queen, and Dick Grayson attend an Inca exhibition at the Gotham Museum, where the main attraction is the "Rose Stone", a recent discovery by Cyborg. Cyborg reveals that the Rose Stone is capable of conducting energy. When the opening ceremony starts, the Joker interrupts the proceedings. Clayface takes on the form of a Tyrannosarus rex and attacks the crowd. The Joker uses a computer virus to take control of all electronic technology in Gotham, including Cyborg, who finds himself forced to fight for the Joker's side. The heroes pursue Joker and the other villains, but they escape. The villains take over the city and Joker declares himself mayor, installing the other villains in his cabinet. The heroes return to the Batcave and discover that the Joker is planning a parade in his own honor. Batman deduces that the villains are hiding out in an abandoned amusement park on the pier. The heroes travel to the amusement park, battle the villains, free Gogo Shoto, and take him to the Batcave. While there, Shoto gives Batman a device that allows him to enter Professor Ivo's virtual world.

The Joker plans to send the virus worldwide. Once the Joker's parade starts, Batman gets close to Joker and uses Shoto's device to enter the AI world, where he sees many copies of the Joker. Batman and the heroes break the Joker's control over Cyborg. After an extended battle sequence (in which the Joker dons a mech suit), Batman realizes Joker intends to use Cyborg as the transmitter to unleash the virus. Cyborg finds the Rose Stone in his left arm. On the advice of Shoto, he places the Stone on the back of the Joker's mech suit. The suit shorts out, Joker falls into the sea, and all the technology reboots. The villains are taken back to Arkham and the Joker begins preparing his next plan.

Cast
 Roger Craig Smith as Batman/Bruce Wayne
 Troy Baker as The Joker
 Khary Payton as Cyborg/Victor Stone
 Chris Diamantopoulos as Green Arrow/Oliver Queen
 Will Friedle as Nightwing/Dick Grayson
 Yuri Lowenthal as Red Robin/Tim Drake
 Kari Wuhrer as Silver Banshee/Siobhan McDougal
 Fred Tatasciore as Solomon Grundy/Cyrus Gold
 Brian T. Delaney as Scarecrow/Dr. Jonathan Crane
 Dave B. Mitchell as Clayface/Basil Karlo
 Noel Fisher as Gogo Shoto
 Cedric Yarbrough as Silas Stone
 Eric Bauza as Houston Raines 
 Richard Epcar as Commissioner James Gordon 
 Alastair Duncan as Alfred Pennyworth
 Amanda Troop as Gladys Windsmere, Newscaster 
 Steven Blum as Gruff Cop, Watchman #2 
 Janell Cox as Ana, Computer

Reception
Both Common Sense Media and CineMagazine rated the film 3 stars.

Sequel
It was followed by a sequel, Batman Unlimited: Mechs vs. Mutants, which was released on July 24, 2016.

References

External links
 DC Comics page
 

2015 animated films
2015 direct-to-video films
2010s animated superhero films
Batman Unlimited (film series)
2010s American animated films
2010s direct-to-video animated superhero films
Films directed by Butch Lukic
2010s English-language films